The Formula 18 class, abbreviated F18, is a non-foiling, restricted development, formula-design sport catamaran class. It was started in the early 1990s and quickly grew getting class recognition by World Sailing, with large racing fleets all over the globe.

Design goals

The overall objective of the class is to offer popular, safe, exciting and fair racing in 18-foot catamarans.

The F18 class is a "box rule" class, which means that any boat that adheres to the limited set of general design specifications may participate in all F18 races. This has led to a score of homebuilders and professional builders to design their own F18 boats and race them in this class. However, it is the mainstream production F18 designs that have dominated the top of the class. The presence of multiple boat builders and sailmakers in the class stimulates innovation and helps to limit costs to sailors.

The F18 box rule allows limited development, striking a balance between the class remaining close to the front edge of multihull design and preserving capital invested in the fleet. Since its introduction, the F18 has seen a steady evolution in both hull and sail shapes, which has led to remarkably improved performance in terms of both handling and speed.  The latest innovation adoption was the introduction of the mainsail "decksweeper" at the 2017 Worlds. Crewed by experienced teams F18s can reach speeds of over 13 knots upwind and more than 20 knots downwind.

The relatively high boat weight facilitates robust construction and limits the benefits from fragile advanced construction techniques, keeping costs down and increasing longevity. It also supports adding interchangeable parts to the platform, for example for use of the platform as a foiling catamaran outside F18 racing. Moreover, the relatively high boat weight reduces the sensitivity of performance to crew weight.

The F18 class also uses an equalizing system, with crew extra weights, to offer competitive racing for a larger crew weight range.

Class development

The Formula 18 was created in 1994 by Olivier Bovyn and Pierre-Charles Barraud to introduce first across the line / elapsed time (versus handicap / corrected time) competition to the sport catamaran sailing community at an affordable cost.  The concept became popular very quickly and due to its fast growth, the F18 attained ISAF Recognised Class status already in 1996, within 18 months after its inception.

Mainly a Europe-based class at the beginning, class membership eventually spread to Australia and the Americas and the F18 class currently has full racing circuits in many places around the globe. Several thousand boats have been sold over the years. The F18 attracts both female and male as well as mixed crews and it is particularly popular among teams with combined crew weights of approximately 140-170 kg.

Its design and popularity has led the F18 to be the boat of choice for long-distance raid events such as the Stockholm Archipelago Raid, the Costarmoricaine, and the Worrell 1000.

The boats are equipped with double trapezes and a gennaker, and as a result, they require a skilled and physically fit crew to be competitive. However, many crews also use this catamaran for purely recreational sailing. 

Over time the class has seen many talented sailors who also made their appearances in Olympic sailing classes, the America’s Cup, Jules Verne Trophy and Volvo Ocean Race, including Carolijn Brouwer, Glenn Ashby, Darren Bundock, Jimmy Spithill, Mitch Booth and Franck Cammas.

The Formula 18 class is governed by the International Formula 18 Class Association and is recognized as a World Sailing Multihull Class.

The early success of the F18 class during the 1990s inspired the founding of the Formula 16 class. In addition, a number of Formula 18 designs have gone on to have competitive one-design racing including the Hobie Tiger, Hobie Wildcat and Nacra Infusion.

Events

World Championships

External links

 World Sailing F18 microsite
 International F18 webpage
 US F18 webpage
 UK F18 webpage
 Dutch F18 webpage
 Australian F18 webpage
 German F18 webpage
 Italian F18 webpage
 Canadian F18 webpage
 Norwegian F18 webpage
 French F18 webpage
 Finnish F18 webpage
 Swedish F18 webpage
 San Francisco Bay Area F18 webpage

References

Classes of World Sailing
Catamarans